George J. Jenkins (unknown–February 15, 2002) was a politician in the province of New Brunswick, Canada He was elected to the Legislative Assembly of New Brunswick in 1991 and did not run for re-election.

He represented the electoral district of East Saint John.

References 

2002 deaths
Year of birth missing
Canadian educators
New Brunswick Liberal Association MLAs
Politicians from Saint John, New Brunswick
Saint Joseph's University alumni
University of New Brunswick alumni
20th-century Canadian politicians